Radmila Drljača-Savić (born December 21, 1959 in Bosanski Novi) is a former Yugoslav handball player who competed in the 1980 Summer Olympics. In 1980, she won the silver medal with the Yugoslav team. She played three matches including the final.

External links
profile

1959 births
Living people
People from Novi Grad, Bosnia and Herzegovina
Bosnia and Herzegovina female handball players
Yugoslav female handball players
Handball players at the 1980 Summer Olympics
Olympic handball players of Yugoslavia
Olympic silver medalists for Yugoslavia
Olympic medalists in handball
Medalists at the 1980 Summer Olympics
Serbs of Bosnia and Herzegovina